The Mountain West Conference (MW) is one of the collegiate athletic conferences affiliated with the National Collegiate Athletic Association (NCAA) Division I Football Bowl Subdivision (FBS) (formerly I-A). The MW officially began operations on January 4, 1999. Geographically, the MW covers a broad expanse of the Western United States, with member schools located in California, Colorado, Hawaii, Idaho, Nevada, New Mexico, Utah, and Wyoming. Gloria Nevarez took over as Commissioner of the MW on January 1, 2023, following the retirement of founding commissioner Craig Thompson.

The charter members of the MW included the United States Air Force Academy, Brigham Young University, Colorado State University, San Diego State University, the University of New Mexico, the University of Nevada, Las Vegas, University of Utah and the University of Wyoming. Before forming the Mountain West Conference, seven of its eight charter members had been longtime members of the Western Athletic Conference and half of these had been charter members of that conference from 1962. Overall, each school that has ever been either a full or football-only member of the MW spent at least three years in the WAC before joining the Mountain West.

History

Genesis
The creation of the MW was a delayed aftereffect of the 1996 NCAA conference realignment, which had initially been triggered two years earlier when the Big Eight Conference agreed to merge with four members of the Southwest Conference (SWC) to create the Big 12 Conference, which would begin competition in the 1996–97 school year.

The Western Athletic Conference, which had initially announced plans to expand beyond its then-current 10 members to at least 12, ended up with even more potential expansion prospects. Ultimately, the WAC took in three of the four SWC schools left out of the Big 12 merger—Rice University, Southern Methodist University (SMU), and Texas Christian University (TCU). Three other schools were added to bring the total membership to 16, namely Big West Conference members San Jose State University and UNLV, plus the University of Tulsa, an NCAA football independent and otherwise a member of the Missouri Valley Conference. The WAC's 16 teams were divided into four four-team "quadrants", two of which rotated between the Mountain and Pacific Divisions every two years. However, the newly expanded WAC was soon wracked by tension between the established and new members.

In spring 1998, BYU and Utah proposed a permanent split into two eight-team divisions. The proposal would have forced some schools into an unnatural alignment because of the geographic distribution of the conference. Air Force was the most strident opponent of this proposal, threatening to become an independent. Soon after the proposal by BYU and Utah, the presidents of Air Force, BYU, Colorado State, Utah, and Wyoming met at Denver International Airport to discuss their future, and they agreed to break away from the WAC to form a new conference. They invited the WAC members New Mexico, San Diego State, and UNLV to join them in what became the Mountain West Conference.

The next move for the MW came in 2005, when the conference added TCU, who had spent the previous four seasons in Conference USA (C-USA).

Early–2010s realignment

On June 11, 2010, Boise State University agreed to join the conference as its tenth member. On June 17, 2010, Utah announced it would be leaving the Mountain West to join what would become the Pac-12 Conference. On August 18, 2010, amidst rumors that BYU was considering leaving the Mountain West to go independent in football and rejoin the Western Athletic Conference in all other sports, the Mountain West Conference officially extended invitations to California State University, Fresno (Fresno State) and the University of Nevada, Reno (Nevada). Both schools accepted and would become the tenth and eleventh members of the league. BYU announced on August 31, 2010, that it would leave the Mountain West Conference and go Independent in football and become a member of the West Coast Conference (WCC) in other sports starting in 2011. On November 29, 2010, TCU announced all athletic teams would move to the Big East Conference effective in 2012. (Less than a year later, on October 10, 2011, TCU announced it would not join the Big East but would join the Big 12, home to fellow former SWC members Baylor, Texas, Texas Tech, and formerly Texas A&M, in 2012 instead.) On December 10, 2010, the University of Hawaii at Mānoa accepted a bid to become the 10th member of the conference for football only. These changes would leave the Mountain West Conference with 10 teams for the 2012 football season.

During the era of football's Bowl Championship Series (BCS), which was replaced by the College Football Playoff (CFP) in 2014, the MW champion qualified for a BCS bowl four times after the BCS formula was tweaked to allow teams from non-BCS conferences to play in BCS bowls if ranked in the top 12. However, two of the three schools that qualified are no longer with the conference.

On October 14, 2011, the Mountain West and C-USA announced a plan for a football only alliance. On February 13, 2012, the two leagues announced that both conferences would be dissolving after the 2012–13 season to reform into one conference with at least 15 members for all sports, and a 16th team, University of Hawaii at Mānoa as a football-only member. However, when the two conferences discussed their plans with the NCAA, they were told that due to NCAA rules, they would forfeit substantial revenues. Specifically, the new conference would receive only one automatic bid to NCAA championships; at least one of the former conferences would lose future revenue distributions from the NCAA men's basketball tournament; and at least one former conference would not be able to collect exit fees from any members that departed to join the new conference. As a result, the Mountain West and C-USA backed away from a full merger. In late March of that year, the commissioners of both conferences stated that all 16 schools had entered into binding agreements to form a new "association", although the Mountain West and C-USA would have apparently remained separate legal entities. In the end, this alliance never materialized due to both conferences soon adding new teams.

On May 2, 2012, San Jose State and Utah State agreed to join the conference for the 2013–14 academic year. On December 31 of that year, Boise State announced that it had backed out of its previously announced move to the Big East for football and the Big West for other sports, and would remain in the MW.

On January 16, 2013, San Diego State accepted an offer to remain/return to the Mountain West Conference in all sports. Keeping SDSU in the conference gives the Mountain West 12 football members, allowing for a Championship Game to be held. The first championship game took place on December 7, 2013.

Potential further expansion
In February 2018, the San Diego Union-Tribune reported that the MW was looking to expand in the near future. In the report, commissioner Craig Thompson revealed that the conference had discussed expansion with six schools, with WCC member Gonzaga (which has not sponsored football since World War II) the only school mentioned by name. Thompson added that Gonzaga could potentially join the MW as a full but non-football member as early as July 2018. While Thompson said that BYU had not contacted the conference, the report indicated that BYU would be open to an MW return, at least in non-football sports, should Gonzaga join. A later Union-Tribune report indicated that talks were advanced enough that the conference's presidents planned a vote on an invitation to Gonzaga during the MW men's and women's basketball tournaments in Las Vegas, but decided to delay the vote until after the Final Four. However, on April 2, the day of the Division I men's title game, Gonzaga athletic director Mike Roth notified the MW, the WCC, and media that the school would remain in the WCC for the immediate future.

Member schools

Current members

Affiliate members

Former members

Membership timeline

NCAA team championships

Excluded from this list are all national championships earned outside the scope of NCAA competition, including Division I FBS football titles, women's AIAW championships (17), equestrian titles (0), and retroactive Helms Athletic Foundation titles.

Sports
The Mountain West Conference sponsors championship competition in eight men's and ten women's NCAA sanctioned sports. Hawai'i is only an associate member for football, and Colorado College is only an associate member for women's soccer.

Men's sports

Men's varsity sports not sponsored by the Mountain West

Women's sports

Women's varsity sports not sponsored by the Mountain West

Conference champions

Rivalries

Conference (football)
Totals and records following the completion of the 2022 football season.

Non–conference (including other sports)

Football

Divisions

Beginning in 2013, the conference split into two divisions, named the "Mountain Division" and "West Division," of six teams each for football. The Mountain West also added a conference championship game, pitting the winners of the two divisions. This first championship game took place on December 7, 2013, at Bulldog Stadium in Fresno, California, the home stadium of Fresno State, the divisional winner with the higher BCS ranking. Each team plays five divisional games and three cross-divisional contests annually.
The 2015 championship game featured the Air Force Academy Falcons against the San Diego State University Aztecs. The 2016 championship game featured the San Diego State University Aztecs against the University of Wyoming Cowboys.

On May 20, 2022, the conference approved a new football schedule format, set to take effect in the 2023 season. Under this format, the conference will remove divisions, and instead play a 2–6 format, where each team plays 2 designated rivals every year along with six separate 6-team rotations that flip every other year, such that every team will have at least one home game and one away game against every other team in a three-year cycle (less than the standard length of a college player's career). The MW Championship will also no longer be determined by the winners of the two divisions; the two teams with the highest conference winning percentage will play instead.  The designated rivals under this system are as follows:

Prior to this, the division format was as follows:

 No other MW sport is split into divisions — including women's soccer, the only other conference sport with 12 competing schools (with Colorado College as the 12th member).

Bowl games
The Mountain West Conference has agreements with six bowls.

Since the 2014 season, the Mountain West champion is eligible for an at-large berth in the Cotton Bowl Classic, Fiesta Bowl, or Peach Bowl, if it is the highest-ranked conference champion among the "Group of Five" conferences (which also includes The American, C-USA, MAC, and Sun Belt) in the final College Football Playoff rankings, if it is not in the top 4. In the 2014 season, Boise State became the first team to receive this berth, being selected for and winning the Fiesta Bowl.

As of 2020,

 If Hawaii is bowl eligible and not MW champions or selected for a CFP bowl, they will receive a berth in the Hawaii Bowl.
 The MW will only send a team to the Cactus or San Francisco Bowls if one of the primary conferences affiliated with those bowls is unable to fill their slots.

Bowl records
As of the 2019–20 bowl games

Bowl Challenge Cup
ESPN created the Bowl Challenge Cup in 2002 for the conference that had the best college football bowl record among Division I Football Bowl Subdivision conferences. The conference has won it five times, more than any other conference, by finishing with bowl game records of 2–1 in 2004–05, 4–1 in 2007–08, 4–1 in 2009–10, 4–1 in 2010–11 and 5–1 in 2021–22.

Men's Basketball
The Mountain West and Missouri Valley Conferences hold an annual challenge series that was renewed in the 2015–16 season after a two-year hiatus. The series began in the 2009-10 season but temporarily ended when the original contract ran out after the 2012-13 season, During the first four seasons of the series, it involved all members of the MW and an equal number of the 10 MVC teams in basketball. With the MW now having 11 basketball members to the MVC's 10, the renewed series involves all MVC teams, with one MW team sitting out.

The first game was on November 13, 2009, featuring the Bradley Braves and the BYU Cougars in Provo and it concluded on December 23 with the Wyoming Cowboys visiting the Northern Iowa Panthers in Cedar Falls, Iowa. The challenge is similar to the ACC-Big Ten Challenge, which pits men's basketball teams from the Atlantic Coast Conference and the Big Ten Conference.

NCAA tournament records
As of the 2021–22 NCAA Division I men's basketball season

Women's Basketball

NCAA tournament records

Facilities

Notes

Elevation
This impacts endurance in sports like football, soccer, and the distance races in track & field and swimming meets; air resistance in sprints and horizontal jumps in track & field; and aerodynamics in baseball, softball, tennis, golf, and the discus and javelin throws. The Mountain West's institutions have the highest average elevations in NCAA Division I sports.

Campus and football stadium elevations
Schools in italics are single-sport members. In the case of women's soccer-only member Colorado College, "Stadium Elevation" refers to the school's soccer venue.

Elevation by conference

 Elevation data obtained from the USGS Geographic Names Information System

References

External links
 

 
Organizations based in Colorado Springs, Colorado
Sports in the Western United States
Organizations established in 1998
Articles which contain graphical timelines
1998 establishments in the United States